Joshua Sands may refer to:

Joshua Sands (politician) (1757-1835), U.S. Representative and Collector of the Port of New York
Joshua R. Sands (1795–1883), United States Navy officer